Tofu is a food made from coagulated soy milk.

Tofu or TOFU may also refer to:

Arts, entertainment, and media 
 Tofu (TV series), a 2015 British online documentary
 Tofu Records, a former American record label for Japanese artists
 The Tofus, an animated series about an environmentally conscious family

Computing and technology 
 TOFU, or trust on first use, a security model associated with encryption protocols
 Slang for a small rectangle used to represent a character that has no printable font 
 , a character within a font used for this purpose
 Tofu, Internet slang for top-posting in e-mail and in Web forums
 Tofu, short for Torus fusion, a supercomputer network topology

See also
 Tufo (disambiguation)
 Du Fu, a Chinese poet
 Toffee